David O'Sullivan (born 11 June 1997) is an Australian  former first-class cricketer.

Sullivan was born at Sydney in June 1997 and was educated in England at Merchant Taylors' School, Northwood. From there he went up to Cardiff Metropolitan University, where he made a single appearance in first-class cricket for Cardiff MCCU against Hampshire at Southampton in 2017. Batting once in the match, O'Sullivan was dismissed for 2 runs in the Cardiff MCCU first innings by Fidel Edwards, while with his right-arm fast-medium bowling he took 3 wickets in Hampshire's first innings and one wicket in their second, taking match figures of 4 for 92.

References

External links

1997 births
Living people
Cricketers from Sydney
Australian emigrants to England
People educated at Merchant Taylors' School, Northwood
Alumni of Cardiff Metropolitan University
English cricketers
Cardiff MCCU cricketers